Hendthigheltheeni (Kannada: ಹೆಂಡ್ತಿಗ್ಹೇಳ್ತೀನಿ) is a 1998 Kannada comedy film written and directed by Dinesh Baboo. It stars Vishnuvardhan, Suhasini in leading roles. Kashi, Vanishree, Baby Ramya, Tara, B. V. Radha, Ramakrishna played pivotal roles.

Plot
The movie is about a couple who are unable to have children. The hero legally adopts a child and plans to surprise his wife by claiming the child to be a daughter of his friend so that once bon homie builds, he can surprise her with the truth. But, once he reaches his house, he is astonished to see another child of same age has already come to his house claiming to be his friend's daughter repeating the exact lines which he had taught his adopted daughter.

Cast
 Vishnuvardhan as Jayaram
 Suhasini Maniratnam as Radha Jayaram
 Sanketh Kashi as Raghava
 Vanishree as Deepthi Raghava
 B. V. Radha as chief of orphanage
 Tara as Seetha
 Sihi Kahi Chandru as Ramakrishna
 Ramakrishna as don
 Pavitra Lokesh as Nandini Chandrashekhar
 Ramya as Nancy Decosta

Soundtrack
The music of the film was composed by V. Manohar.

References

Indian comedy films
Indian comedy-drama films
Films scored by V. Manohar
1990s Kannada-language films
Films directed by Dinesh Baboo